Ripuarian (also Ripuarian Franconian; , , ripuarische Mundart, ripuarischer Dialekt, ripuarisch-fränkische Mundart, Ribuarisch, Noordmiddelfrankisch) is a German dialect group, part of the West Central German language group.
Together with the Moselle Franconian which includes the Luxembourgish language, Ripuarian belongs to the larger Central Franconian dialect family and also to the Rhinelandic linguistic continuum with the Low Franconian languages.

It is spoken in the Rhineland south of the Benrath line — from northwest of Düsseldorf and Cologne to Aachen in the west and to Waldbröl in the east.

The language area also comprises the north of the German-speaking Community of Belgium as well as the southern edge of the Limburg province of the Netherlands, especially Kerkrade (Kirchroa), where it is perceived as a variety of Limburgish and legally treated as such. The name derives from the Ripuarian Franks (Rheinfranken), who settled in the area from the 4th century onward.

The most well known Ripuarian dialect is Kölsch, the local dialect of Cologne. Dialects belonging to the Ripuarian group almost always call themselves Platt (spelled  in the Netherlands) like Öcher Platt (of Aachen), Bönnsch Platt (of Bonn), Eischwiele Platt (of Eschweiler), Kirchröadsj plat (of Kerkrade), or Bocheser plat (of Bocholtz). Most of the more than one hundred Ripuarian dialects are bound to one specific village or municipality. Usually there are small distinctive differences between neighbouring dialects (which are, however, easily noticeable to locals), and increasingly bigger differences between the more distant dialects. These are described by a set of isoglosses called the Rhenish fan in linguistics. The way people talk, even if they are not using Ripuarian, often allows them to be traced precisely to a village or city quarter where they learned to speak.

Number of speakers
About a million people speak a variation of Ripuarian dialect, which constitutes about one quarter of the inhabitants of the area. Penetration of Ripuarian in everyday communication varies considerably, as does the percentage of Ripuarian speakers from one place to another. In some places there may only be a few elderly speakers left, while elsewhere Ripuarian usage is common in everyday life. Both in the genuine Ripuarian area and far around it, the number of people passively understanding Ripuarian to some extent exceeds the number of active speakers by far. Estimates assume some ten, and up to twenty million speakers.

Geographic significance
Speakers are centred on the German city of Köln (Cologne). The language's distribution starts from the important geographic transition into the flat-lands coming down from the Middle Rhine. The Ripuarian varieties are related to the Moselle Franconian languages spoken in the southern Rhineland (Rhineland-Palatinate and Saarland) in Germany, to the Luxembourgish language in Luxembourg, to the Low Franconian Limburgish language in the Dutch province of Limburg, and to Low Dietsch in Liège Province, Belgium. Most of the historic roots of Ripuarian languages are in Middle German, but there were other influences too, such as Latin, Low German, Dutch, French and Southern Meuse-Rhenish (Limburgish). Several elements of grammar are unique to Ripuarian and do not exist in the other languages of Germany.

The French Community of Belgium and the Netherlands officially recognise some Ripuarian dialects as minority languages, and the European Union likewise follows.

Grammar

Numerals 
The transcription from Münch, in which the grave accent (`) and macron (¯) represent, respectively, accent 1 and 2 in the Franconian pitch accent.

Pronouns 
Ripuarian (excluding City-Colognian) emphasised personal pronouns:

See also
 Bergish dialects
 South Bergish
 Eifelplatt
 Lex Ripuaria
 Low Dietsch
 Rheinische Dokumenta
 Rhinelandic regiolect
 Ripuarian Franks
 Southern Meuse-Rhenish

Literature
 Maria Loiuse Denst: Olper Platt - Bergisches Mundart-Wörterbuch für Kürten-Olpe und Umgebung. Schriftenreihe des Bergischen Geschichtsvereins Abt. Rhein-Berg e. V. Band 29. Bergisch Gladbach 1999. 
 Hans Bruchhausen und Heinz Feldhoff: Us Platt kalle un verstonn - Mundartwörterbuch Lützenkirchen-Quettingen. Bergisch Gladbach 2005. 
 Leo Lammert und Paul Schmidt: Neunkirchen-Seelscheider Sprachschatz, herausgegeben vom Heimat- und Geschichtsverein Neunkirchen-Seelscheid 2006. (ca. 7300 Wörter)
 Theodor Branscheid (Hrsg): „Oberbergische Sprachproben. Mundartliches aus Eckenhagen und Nachbarschaft.“ Band 1, Eckenhagen, 1927.
 Heinrichs, Werner: Bergisch Platt - Versuch einer Bestandsaufnahme, Selbstverlag, Burscheid, 1978
 Manfred Konrads: Wörter und Sachen im Wildenburger Ländchen, Rheinland-Verlag, Köln, 1981
 Helmut Fischer: 'Wörterbuch der unteren Sieg. Rheinische Mundarten. Beiträge zur Volkssprache aus den rheinischen Landschaften Band 4. Rheinland Verlag, Köln, 1985. 
 Georg Wenker: Das rheinische Platt. 1877.
 Georg Wenker: Das rheinische Platt, (Sammlung deutsche Dialektgeographie Heft 8), Marburg, 1915.
 Georg Cornelissen, Peter Honnen, Fritz Langensiepen (editor): Das rheinische Platt. Eine Bestandsaufnahme. Handbuch der rheinischen Mundarten Teil 1: Texte. Rheinland-Verlag, Köln. 1989.

References

 
West Germanic languages
Central German languages
German dialects
Languages of Germany
Languages of Belgium
Languages of the Netherlands
North Rhine-Westphalia
Subject–object–verb languages
Verb-second languages